Stardom is a 2000 Canadian comedy-drama film directed by Denys Arcand and written by J.Jacob Potashnik and Arcand. It stars Jessica Paré and Dan Aykroyd. It tells the story of a young girl who tries to cope with her rise to stardom after being discovered by a fashion agency. The film was screened out of competition at the 2000 Cannes Film Festival.

Arcand cited his later film Days of Darkness (2007) as similar to Stardom, though Days of Darkness was ostensibly a sequel to his other films The Decline of the American Empire (1986) and The Barbarian Invasions (2003).

Cast

References

External links
 
 
 Denys Arcand's Stardom: media mania and the beauty of beauty

2000 films
English-language Canadian films
Canadian coming-of-age comedy-drama films
Films directed by Denys Arcand
Films about actors
2000s coming-of-age comedy-drama films
2000 comedy films
2000 drama films
French-language Canadian films
2000s Canadian films